Asanbayev is a Russian surname. Notable people with the surname include:

 Ulyqbek Asanbayev (born 1979), Kazakh footballer
 Yerik Asanbayev (1936–2004), Kazakh-Russian statesman, vice-president of the Republic of Kazakhstan

Russian-language surnames